Acraea ella, the Ella's acraea, is a butterfly in the family Nymphalidae. It is found in Angola and north-western Namibia.

Description

A. ella Eltr. (60 b) is so similar to equatorialis that it is sufficient to mention the differences. Somewhat larger, expanse 50 to 60 mm.; forewing completely scaled without grey subapical band. Angola.

Taxonomy
It is a member of the Acraea caecilia species group. See also Pierre & Bernaud, 2014.

References

Butterflies described in 1911
ella